Edwin Keith Lackey was a Canadian Anglican bishop in the second half of the 20th century.

Lackey was born on 10 June 1929  and educated at Bishop's University, Lennoxville. Ordained in 1954,  he began his ministry with a curacy in Cornwall, Ontario and then held incumbencies at Russell, Vankleek Hill and St Michael and All Angels, Ottawa. He was then Director of Programmes and Archdeacon of the Diocese of Ottawa before his ordination to the episcopate as the 6th Bishop of Ottawa in 1981. In 1991 he was appointed Metropolitan of Ontario. He died on 9 January 1992.

References

 

1929 births
1992 deaths
20th-century Anglican Church of Canada bishops
Anglican archdeacons in North America
Anglican bishops of Ottawa
Metropolitans of Ontario
Bishop's University alumni
20th-century Anglican archbishops